Attulus pubescens is a species of jumping spiders (family Salticidae). Until 2017, it was known as Sitticus pubescens.

Description
Both are darkish in colour with variable white markings. Identification is based on the precise structure of the female epigyne and the male palpal bulb.

Distribution and habitat
A. pubescens is native to Europe (including England and Wales), and from North Africa through to Turkey and Afghanistan. It has been introduced to the United States. The species is often associated with people, being found on walls and fences and sometimes inside houses. Away from dwellings, it is also found under stones and on tree trunks.

References

External links

Sitticini
Spiders described in 1775
Spiders of Europe
Spiders of Asia
Spiders of Africa
Taxa named by Johan Christian Fabricius